Shiloh is an unincorporated community in Hampshire County in the U.S. state of West Virginia. Shiloh is located on Gore Road (West Virginia Secondary Route 23/11) near the Virginia line. Shiloh was once a stop on the old Winchester and Western Railroad. The community was named for Shiloh, a site mentioned in the Hebrew Bible that contained the Ark of the Covenant.

References 

Unincorporated communities in Hampshire County, West Virginia
Unincorporated communities in West Virginia